Senator Hobbs may refer to:

Albert Hobbs (1822–1897), New York State Senate
Alexander R. Hobbs (1852–1929), Virginia State Senate
Frederick Hobbs (Pennsylvania politician) (1934–2005), Pennsylvania State Senate
Katie Hobbs (born 1969), Arizona State Senate
Steve Hobbs (Washington politician) (born 1970), Washington State Senate